The Fuller–Bemis House is a historic house at 41–43 Cherry Street in Waltham, Massachusetts. The -story wood-frame house was built c. 1776, and is one of Waltham's few 18th century houses. It was built when the south side, where it is located, was still part of Newton. It was converted into a two-family structure in the 19th century. Its relatively plain Georgian styling sets it apart from the later 19th century housing that surrounds it.

The house was listed on the National Register of Historic Places in 1990.

See also
National Register of Historic Places listings in Waltham, Massachusetts
List of the oldest buildings in Massachusetts
List of the oldest buildings in the United States

References

Houses on the National Register of Historic Places in Waltham, Massachusetts
Georgian architecture in Massachusetts
Houses completed in 1776
Houses in Waltham, Massachusetts